Alex Blankson (born 26 December 1980)  is a Ghanaian politician and member of parliament for Akrofuom Constituency in the Ashanti Region of Ghana. He is a member of the New Patriotic Party.

Early life  and education 
Blankson was born on 26 December 1980. He hails from  Adansi Akrofuom. Blankson attended Adisadel College and obtained his Senior Secondary School Certificate in 1999.

Career 
Alex was the CEO for Day by Day Healthcare Limited.

Political career 
During the 2020 Ghanaian general election, Blankson contested for the Akrofuom seat with Joseph Azumah of the NDC, and Prosper Maar of NDP. He polled 11,992 votes representing 58.51% of the total valid votes against Joseph Azumah  8400 votes and Prosper Maar 103 votes, representing 41.5% and 0.5% of the total valid votes cast respectively. In 2021, Alan Kyeremanten sworn in Alex Blankson as a board member in a seven-member governing body of Ghana Heavy Equipment Limited.

Committees 
Alex is a member of the Youth, Sports and Culture Committee and also a member of the Special Budget Committee.

Personal life 
Alex is a Christian. He is the grandson of Nana Okai Ababio.

Philanthropy 
In December 2021, he presented about 400 pieces of roofing sheets to aid in the completion of the Grumesa community center. In June 2021, he aided in the planting of over 9,000 trees in the Adansi Akrofuom area.

References 

1980 births
Living people
Ghanaian MPs 2021–2025
New Patriotic Party politicians
Alumni of Adisadel College